Ximene Gomes (born 8 September 1989) is a Mozambican swimmer, who specialized in sprint freestyle events. She represented her nation Mozambique at the 2008 Summer Olympics, finishing among the top 60 swimmers in the women's 50 m freestyle.

Gomes was invited by FINA to compete as a lone female Mozambican swimmer in the 50 m freestyle at the 2008 Summer Olympics in Beijing. Swimming as the fastest entrant in heat four, Gomes exploded off the blocks and came up with a magnificent effort to the top of the field in a scorching time and lifetime best of 28.15. Gomes' astonishing feat from the prelims was not enough to put her through to the semifinals, sharing a tie with Albania's Rovena Marku for the fifty-eighth overall position.

References

External links

NBC 2008 Olympics profile

1989 births
Living people
Sportspeople from Maputo
Mozambican people of Portuguese descent
Commonwealth Games competitors for Mozambique
Swimmers at the 2006 Commonwealth Games
Olympic swimmers of Mozambique
Swimmers at the 2008 Summer Olympics
Mozambican female freestyle swimmers